Ide Mahasudina is a 1965 Indian Kannada-language film, directed by B. C. Srinivas and produced by Udaykumar and Dhanjee Kalyanjee. The film stars Rajkumar, Udaykumar, Balakrishna and Raghavendra Rao. The film has musical score by B. Gopal. The movie was produced by actor Udaykumar - one of his first movie productions.

Cast

Rajkumar as Dr. Anand
Udaykumar as Raja, Anand's brother
Balakrishna
B. Raghavendra Rao
Leelavathi as Indira
Harini as Radha
M. Jayashree as Poornima, Anand and Raja's mother
Dinesh as Ranga
B. Jaya as Chenni, Ranga's wife
H. P. Saroja
Makeup Subbanna
Comedian Guggu
Narayan
U. N. Simha
Sampige Shankar
Sanjeeva Rao
Krishna Shastry
Lakshmi
Baby Vardhini
Vijayabharathi
Suryakumari
Krishna

Soundtrack

References

External links
 
 

1965 films
1960s Kannada-language films